Allar Raja (born 22 June 1983) is an Estonian rower. He is a member of rowing club "SK Kalev" located in Pärnu.

Rowing career

2000–2008
Raja competed in the World Rowing Junior Championships in 2000 in the quadruple sculls event (19th) and in 2001 in the double sculls event (13th). In 2004 he competed in the U-23 World Regatta in the single sculls event achieving 8th position.

His first appearance in the World Rowing Championships was in 2005 in Gifu, Japan in the double sculls event with Silver Sonntak. They were second in Final C, achieving 14th position overall. Raja won his first World Championships medal in 2006 in Eton, Great Britain, where ha was a member of the bronze-winning quadruple sculls team with Andrei Jämsä, Tõnu Endrekson and Igor Kuzmin. 2007 in Munich, Germany he competed in the quadruple sculls event with Kuzmin, Latin and Taimsoo earning 8th position. The same team was 5th at the 2007 European Rowing Championships held in Poznań, Poland. At the 2008 European Rowing Championships in Marathon, Greece he won a gold medal in the quadruple sculls event with Jüri Jaanson, Tõnu Endrekson and Andrei Jämsä.

Allar Raja made his first appearance at the Olympics in Beijing 2008 competing in the quadruple sculls event with Igor Kuzmin, Vladimir Latin and Kaspar Taimsoo. The men were 4th in their preliminary heat and won the repechage. In the semifinals they finished fourth and did not get to Final A. The final place was 9th as they finished third in Final B.

2009–2012
Raja won his second World Championships bronze medal in Poznań in 2009, where he competed in the double sculls event with Kaspar Taimsoo. Raja and Taimsoo finished 8th at the 2010 World Rowing Championships held at Lake Karapiro, New Zealand. The same crew finished 7th at the 2011 World Rowing Championships.

At the 2009 European Championships, held in Brest, Belarus, Raja won his second European title. This time in the double sculls event with Kaspar Taimsoo. The same crew finished second at the 2010 European Championships. For the 2011 European Championships Raja and Taimsoo formed a new quad scull team with Tõnu Endrekson and Andrei Jämsä. The crew finished second after Russia and won the silver medals. The same crew finished won a gold medal at the 2012 European Championships.

At the 2012 Summer Olympics, held in London, Raja also represented Estonia in the quadruple sculls event. This time with Kaspar Taimsoo, Tõnu Endrekson and Andrei Jämsä. The crew finished second in their preliminary heat and also in the semifinal, thus earning a place in Final A. In the final they finished just outside the medals in 4th place behind crews from Germany, Croatia and Australia, respectively.

2013–2016

In summer of 2013 Raja and Taimsoo formed a new quadruple scull crew with young prospects Sten-Erik Anderson and Kaur Kuslap. They also finished 5th at the 2013 World Rowing Championships held at Tangeum Lake, Chungju in South Korea. The same team repeated their 5th place at the 2014 World Rowing Championships held in Amsterdam. At the 2013 European Championships, held in Seville, Spain Raja competed in the double sculls event with Kaspar Taimsoo. The result was a disappointment as the men did not reach Final A and finished in 7th place overall.

In the summer of 2015 Raja and Taimsoo reunited with Tõnu Endrekson and Andrei Jämsä in preparation for the 2016 Olympic Games. The crew went on to win a bronze medal at the 2015 World Rowing Championships held in France. In the spring of 2016 they also won a gold medal at the 2016 European Championships. At the 2016 Summer Olympics, held in Rio de Janeiro, Taimsoo made his third olympic appearance in the quadruple sculls event, with Raja, Endrekson and Jämsä. The crew won their preliminary heat, thus earning a place in Final A. In the final they finished third winning the bronze medals, behind crews from Germany and Australia, respectively.

Achievements
Olympic Games Medals: 1 Bronze
World Championship Medals: 4 Bronze
European Championship Medals: 4 Gold, 2 Silver, 1 Bronze

Olympic Games
2008 – 9th, Quadruple sculls (with Kaspar Taimsoo, Igor Kuzmin, Vladimir Latin)
2012 – 4th, Quadruple sculls (with Kaspar Taimsoo, Tõnu Endrekson, Andrei Jämsä)
2016 – Bronze , Quadruple sculls (with Kaspar Taimsoo, Tõnu Endrekson, Andrei Jämsä)
2020 – 6th, Quadruple sculls (with Kaspar Taimsoo, Tõnu Endrekson, Jüri-Mikk Udam)

World Rowing Championships
2005 – 14th, Double sculls (with Silver Sonntak)
2006 – Bronze , Quadruple sculls (with Andrei Jämsä, Tõnu Endrekson, Igor Kuzmin)
2007 – 8th, Quadruple sculls (with Kaspar Taimsoo, Igor Kuzmin, Vladimir Latin)
2009 – Bronze , Double sculls (Kaspar Taimsoo)
2010 – 8th, Double sculls (with Kaspar Taimsoo)
2011 – 7th, Double sculls (with Kaspar Taimsoo)
2013 – 5th, Quadruple sculls (with Allar Raja, Sten-Erik Anderson, Kaur Kuslap)
2014 – 5th, Quadruple sculls (with Allar Raja, Sten-Erik Anderson, Kaur Kuslap)
2015 – Bronze , Quadruple sculls (with Kaspar Taimsoo, Tõnu Endrekson, Andrei Jämsä)
2017 – Bronze , Quadruple sculls (with Kaspar Taimsoo, Tõnu Endrekson, Kaur Kuslap)
2019 – 12th, Quadruple sculls (with Kaspar Taimsoo, Tõnu Endrekson, Kaur Kuslap)
2022 – 5th, Quadruple sculls (with Mikhail Kushteyn, Tõnu Endrekson, Johann Poolak)

European Rowing Championships
2007 – 5th, Quadruple sculls (with Kaspar Taimsoo, Igor Kuzmin, Vladimir Latin)
2008 – Gold , Quadruple sculls (with Jüri Jaanson, Tõnu Endrekson, Andrei Jämsä)
2009 – Gold , Double sculls (with Kaspar Taimsoo)
2010 – Silver , Double sculls (with Kaspar Taimsoo)
2011 – Silver , Quadruple sculls (with Kaspar Taimsoo, Tõnu Endrekson, Andrei Jämsä)
2012 – Gold , Quadruple sculls (with Kaspar Taimsoo, Tõnu Endrekson, Andrei Jämsä)
2013 – 7th, Double sculls (with Kaspar Taimsoo)
2014 – 6th, Quadruple sculls (with Kaspar Taimsoo, Sten-Erik Anderson, Kaur Kuslap)
2015 – 8th, Quadruple sculls (with Kaspar Taimsoo, Sten-Erik Anderson, Tõnu Endrekson)
2016 – Gold , Quadruple sculls (with Kaspar Taimsoo, Tõnu Endrekson, Andrei Jämsä)
2017 – 7th, Quadruple sculls (with Kaspar Taimsoo, Sten-Erik Anderson, Kaur Kuslap)
2018 – 9th, Quadruple sculls (with Kaspar Taimsoo, Sten-Erik Anderson, Kaur Kuslap)
2019 – 15th, Double sculls (with Kaur Kuslap)
2020 – 4th, Quadruple sculls (with Kaspar Taimsoo, Tõnu Endrekson, Jüri-Mikk Udam)
2021 – Bronze , Quadruple sculls (with Kaspar Taimsoo, Tõnu Endrekson, Jüri-Mikk Udam)
2022 – 5th, Quadruple sculls (with Mikhail Kushteyn, Tõnu Endrekson, Johann Poolak)

U23 World Rowing Championships
2004 – 8th, Single sculls

Junior World Rowing Championships
2000 – 19th, Quadruple sculls
2001 – 13th, Double sculls

Henley Royal Regatta
2008 – Queen Mother Challenge Cup

Rowing World Cup

References

External links

 
 
 
 

1983 births
Living people
People from Sindi, Estonia
Estonian male rowers
Olympic rowers of Estonia
Rowers at the 2008 Summer Olympics
Rowers at the 2012 Summer Olympics
Rowers at the 2016 Summer Olympics
Rowers at the 2020 Summer Olympics
World Rowing Championships medalists for Estonia
Medalists at the 2016 Summer Olympics
Olympic medalists in rowing
Olympic bronze medalists for Estonia
Recipients of the Order of the White Star, 3rd Class